Postcombe is a village in the civil parish of Lewknor. It is on the A40 road with the Chiltern Hills to the east and the M40 motorway just to the south.

In 1971–73 the M40 Archaeological research group excavating a site at Postcombe
found three Saxon graves, one of which was of a child. A bronze buckle in one of the graves dated the burials to the 7th century.

On the morning of 18 June 1643, Royalist cavalry based in Oxford attacked a Parliamentary garrison based in the village, setting fire to some of the houses.
 
The village has a public house, England's Rose, that was formerly The Feathers. There is also a filling station. The current Lord of the Manor is Nigel Ross Parsons.

External links

 
 
 Village community page
 Visit South Oxfordshire

References

Villages in Oxfordshire